Humbertiella is a genus of plants, in the Malvaceae (mallow family) from Madagascar.  The genus was named in 1926 for Jean-Henri Humbert (1887–1967), a French botanist and conservationist.

Species
, the following species were accepted in Plants of the World Online:
 Humbertiella decaryi (Hochr.) Dorr
 Humbertiella foliosa (Hochr. & Humbert) Dorr
 Humbertiella henricii Hochr.
 Humbertiella quararibeoides Hochr.
 Humbertiella sakamaliensis (Hochr.) Dorr
 Humbertiella tormeyae Dorr

References

Hibisceae
Malvaceae genera
Flora of Madagascar